Velamakucha Venkata Ramana Reddy (born 17 December 1970), known professionally as Dil Raju, is an Indian film producer and distributor known for his works in Telugu cinema. He has also financed some Tamil and Hindi films and owns the production company Sri Venkateswara Creations. Raju has won two National Film Awards and was honoured with the Nagi Reddy–Chakrapani National Award in 2013 for his contributions to popular cinema.

Early life and career
Dil Raju was born in Narsingpalli in Nizamabad district of present-day Telangana. He was educated in Mudakpally and Nizamabad, and was interested in films from a young age. He later moved to Hyderabad and did automobile business with his brothers. He ventured into film distribution in the 1990s with the film Pelli Pandiri (1997) and started Sri Venkateswara Film Distributors in 1999.

Personal Life
Raju married Anita and has a daughter Hanshita Reddy. Anita died in 2017 due to cardiac arrest. Raju later married Tejaswini in 2020. Tejaswini's name was changed to Vygha Reddy following her marriage as per astrology. They have a son born in 2022.

Film production
Sri Venkateswara Creations

Collaborations

Matinee Entertainments (subsidiary)

Collaborations with other producers

Dubbed films

Other language productions

Awards 
National Film Awards
 Best Popular Film Providing Wholesome Entertainment – Golden Lotus (producer) – Sathamanam Bhavati – (2016)
 Best Popular Film Providing Wholesome Entertainment – Golden Lotus (producer) – Maharshi – (2019)
Nandi Awards
 Best Feature Film (Gold) – Bommarillu (2006)
 Best Feature Film (Bronze) – Parugu (2008)
 Akkineni Award for Best Home-viewing Feature Film – Seethamma Vakitlo Sirimalle Chettu (2013)
 Nagi Reddy-Chakrapani National Award for contributions to popular cinema – (2013)

Filmfare Awards South
 Filmfare Award for Best Film – Telugu – Bommarillu (2006)

Santosham Film Awards
 Santosham D. Ramanaidu Smarakam Award (2019)
Other Awards
 Nagi Reddy Memorial Award for the Best Telugu Family Entertainer of the year 2011 – Mr. Perfect

References 

Film producers from Telangana
Nandi Award winners
Filmfare Awards South winners
Telugu film producers
Living people
People from Nizamabad, Telangana
Producers who won the Best Popular Film Providing Wholesome Entertainment National Film Award
1965 births
Santosham Film Awards winners